David Chad Campbell (born May 31, 1974) is an American professional golfer who plays on the PGA Tour, where he has won four times. He also notably finished as a runner-up at the 2009 Masters, after losing in a sudden-death playoff.

Early years and amateur career
Campbell was born in Andrews, Texas and grew up in west Texas. He was a member of a strong junior college men's golf squad during the years (1992–94) he played at Midland College. He was the conference medalist in 1993, the year that the MC team dominated the Western Junior College Athletic Conference (WJCAC) and won the regional title. In 1994, the Chaps repeated as WJCAC champions and finished second in the National Junior College Athletic Association (NJCAA) championship. That year, Campbell was WJCAC medalist, Region V Tournament medalist and the NJCAA Tournament medalist runner-up. In 1994, he was named an NJCAA All-American. He was listed as the number one player in the final NJCAA national poll. After two years at MC, he won a scholarship and transferred to the University of Nevada-Las Vegas (UNLV). He turned professional in 1996.

Professional career
Prior to 2000, Campbell played on the third-tier NGA Hooters Tour, where he won 13 tournaments and was the leading money winner three times. Campbell left the tour as the career leader in wins and earnings. In 2001, he played on the second-tier Buy.com Tour, now known as the Korn Ferry Tour, where he earned a "battlefield promotion," winning three tournaments to earn promotion to the elite PGA Tour part way through the season.

In 2003, Campbell won The Tour Championship, was runner-up to surprise winner Shaun Micheel at the PGA Championship, and finished seventh on the PGA Tour money list. He claimed a second PGA Tour win in 2004 and made a strong start to 2006, winning the Bob Hope Chrysler Classic and topping the money list for a short time early in the season. He won his fourth PGA Tour title by one stroke at the 2007 Viking Classic.

Campbell finished as a runner-up at the 2009 Masters, after losing in a three man sudden-death playoff, involving Ángel Cabrera and Kenny Perry. The three players had finished regulation play at 12-under par. At the first extra hole, Campbell hit his second shot from the middle of the fairway but found the greenside bunker. He played out of the bunker to four feet past the hole, but missed the par putt and was eliminated, as both Cabrera and Perry made pars. Earlier in the week, Campbell had made the best start to a Masters Tournament, after making five birdies in the first five holes.

Campbell featured in the top 10 of the Official World Golf Ranking briefly in 2004.

Campbell played the 2013–14 season with conditional status, but failed to graduate from the Web.com Tour finals. He used a career money list exemption for 2014–15 and retained exempt status the following year.

Professional wins (20)

PGA Tour wins (4)

PGA Tour playoff record (0–2)

Buy.com Tour wins (3)

NGA Hooters Tour wins (13)
5 wins before 2000
2000 (8) Silver Springs Shores, Emerald Lake GC, Gold Creek Resort, Oak Hills GC, Saddle Creek GC, Cobblestone GC, The Cape, Lost Key GC

Playoff record
Other playoff record (0–2)

Results in major championships

CUT = missed the half-way cut
"T" = tied for place

Summary

Most consecutive cuts made – 3 (three times)
Longest streak of top-10s – 1 (four times)

Results in The Players Championship

CUT = missed the halfway cut
"T" indicates a tie for a place

Results in World Golf Championships

QF, R16, R32, R64 = Round in which player lost in match play
"T" = tied
Note that the HSBC Champions did not become a WGC event until 2009.

PGA Tour career summary

* Complete through the 2020 season.

U.S. national team appearances
Professional
Ryder Cup: 2004, 2006, 2008 (winners)

See also
2001 Buy.com Tour graduates

References

External links

American male golfers
UNLV Rebels men's golfers
PGA Tour golfers
Ryder Cup competitors for the United States
Korn Ferry Tour graduates
Golfers from Texas
People from Andrews, Texas
People from Colleyville, Texas
1974 births
Living people